Scutigerinidae is a family of centipedes restricted to southern Africa and Madagascar.

References 

 ITIS

Centipede families
Scutigeromorpha